Oebares (Old Persian: Va(h)ubara) was a Persian officer of Cyrus the Great (fl. c. 6th century BC). When Cyrus sent Petisaces to bring Astyages to court from his satrapy, Oebares caused Petisaces to leave the old king Astyages to die in the desert, when this was discovered he proceeded to starve himself to death to avoid falling to an act of vengeance from Astyages' daughter.

He is mentioned in Photius' Bibliotheca.

References

401 BC deaths
5th-century BC Iranian people
Officials of Cyrus the Great
Year of birth unknown